Nxaunxau is a village in North-West District of Botswana. It is located close to Okavango Delta and Namibian border. The population was 330 in 2001 census.

References

North-West District (Botswana)
Villages in Botswana